Li Qihong (born April 1954 in Zhongshan, Guangdong) is the current Deputy Secretary of CPC Zhongshan Committee and mayor of Zhongshan.

Biography
She masters a postgraduate degree from Party School of CPC Guangdong Committee. She began working in June 1968 and joined the Communist Party of China in August 1974.

Profile
June 1968 - January 1972:
Staff of the Zhongqu Rattan Craft Plant in Zhongshan
January 1972 - August 1975:
Director of the Chaoyang Neighborhood Committee in Shiqi, Zhongshan
August 1975 - February 1984:
Deputy Secretary of the CPC Shiqi Committee
Secretary of the CPC Yandun District Committee
August 1975 - September 1990:
Director of the People's Government of Yandun District
February 1984 - September 1990:
Deputy Secretary of the CPC Yandun District Committee
September 1990 - September 1995:
Deputy Director General of the Zhongshan Women's Federation
Vice Chair of the Zhongshan Women's Federation
September 1995 - October 1997:
Chairman of the Zhongshan Women's Federation
October 1997 - March 1999:
Member of the Standing Committee of the CPC Zhongshan Committee
October 1997 - March 2004:
Director General of the Organization Department of the CPC Zhongshan Committee
March 1999 - January 2007:
President of the Zhongshan Party School
March 1999 - Current:
Deputy Secretary of the CPC Zhongshan Committee
March 2004 - January 2007:
Secretary General of the CPC Zhongshan Committee
December 2006 - January 2007:
Vice Mayor of Zhongshan
Acting Mayor of Zhongshan
January 2007 - Current:
Mayor of Zhongshan

References

1954 births
Living people
Politicians from Zhongshan
Regional leaders in the People's Republic of China
People's Republic of China politicians from Guangdong
Chinese Communist Party politicians from Guangdong
Mayors of places in China
Political office-holders in Guangdong